Yun Jeung or Yun Chǔng (1629–1714) was a Confucian scholar in Korea during the late period of the Joseon dynasty.  He was known as being a progressive thinker and for his opposition to the formalism and ritualism in the predominant philosophy of Chu Hsi.  Yun Chung refused government office because he thought the Korean monarchy was corrupt, and spend his life teaching Sirhak ideas.  He is known for the quote, "The king could exist without the people, but the people could not exist without the king."

Yun held ideological debates with Song Siyŏl, known as the Hoeni Sibi (懷尼是非,"The Right and Wrong Between Song and Yun"), over the matters of ritualism and politics.

Yun may also considered an early feminist, as he praised and honored female scholars of Confucianism, a position that was typically reserved for males.

Life
Yun was born in 1629 in Jungseonbang(貞善坊, modern day jongno). In 1642, he studied Neo confucianism with his father in a mountain.

Works 
 Myeongjaeyugo (명재유고, 明齋遺顧)
 Myeongjaeuiryemundap (명재의례문답, 明齋疑禮問答)
 Myeongjaeyuseo (명재유서)

References

Bibliography 
 Kang, Jae-eun; Lee, Suzanne (2006). The land of scholars: two thousand years of Korean Confucianism. Homa & Sekey Books. .

1629 births
1714 deaths
17th-century Korean writers
18th-century Korean writers
Joseon politicians
Korean Confucianists
Korean scholars
17th-century Korean philosophers
Papyeong Yun clan